Dashkasan  is a three cave complex located  south-east of Soltaniyeh. Outside the caves there is a temple called Dragon Stone of Dash Kasan Caves which was built by order of Mongol king Öljaitü in the early fourteenth century. The temple was built by four Chinese craftsmen. The architecture of Dash Kasan caves looks like an incomplete rectangle.

References

Caves of Iran
Religious buildings and structures in Iran
Landforms of Zanjan Province
Buildings and structures in Zanjan Province